This is a list of French football transfers for the 2011 summer transfer window. The summer transfer window opened on 9 June 2011 and closed at midnight on 31 August 2011. Only moves involving Ligue 1 and Ligue 2 clubs are listed. Players without a club may join one at any time, either during or in between transfer windows.

Transfers

	
 Player who signs with a club before the transfer window opened in June 2011 officially joined his new club on 1 July 2011, while a player who joins after the open of the transfer window will join his new club following his signature of the contract.

References

French
Transfers Summer 2011
2011